Tyva Kyzy (Тыва Кызы, pronounced ) (Daughters of Tuva) is an all-female folk ensemble performing Tuvan throat-singing, under the direction of Choduraa Tumat. It is the first and only women's group in Tuva that performs all styles of Tuvan throat-singing.

Background
There were a few female throat-singers in Tuva's history, though it was believed a woman performing throat-singing could hurt her male relatives and cause her difficulties during childbirth. Choldak-Kara Oyun, the mother of the famous throat singer Soruktu Kyrgys and grandmother of the husband of famous Tuvan actress Kara-Kys Namzatovna Munzuk, throat-sang throughout her life while milking her cows, singing lullabies to her children and sometimes while she was drinking Tuvan araga. Close relatives of famous singers, like Khunashtaar-ool's niece (in the 1960s) and Kombu's daughter (in the 1940s or 1950s), performed khoomei (throat-singing) in public more than once. The wife of the throat-singing shaman Bilek-ool from Manchurek, Aldinsova Tortoyavna, said that she has always sung khoomei "because it was innate to [her] from birth." She could not resist singing khoomei after she got married and had children, and sang khoomei in public in the 1950s and 1960s. But her sister, who also sang khoomei as a girl, gave up when others repeatedly reminded her of the supposed dangers.

In the Soviet era it was rare for women to perform on stage, except during Republican festivals. Valentina Salchak performed throat-singing in public in 1979. Valentina Chuldum from Mongun-Taiga (1960- Autumn 2002) toured European countries as a throat-singer in the early 1990s. With the start of the International Symposium of Khoomei women could sing publicly there.

Since its inception in 1998, Tyva Kyzy has participated in numerous international festivals of world music in Europe and Japan. They also toured the United States in October 2005. Tyva Kyzy performs the five main styles of khöömei with traditional female vocal styles. They utilize a range of folk instruments including their own signature instrument the chadagan (similar to the zither or hammered dulcimer). Several members perform in the Tuvan National Orchestra and member Ayana Mongush conducts the orchestra. Their songs are a blend of contemporary and traditional culture, some very old and some written and composed by the group or specifically for them. Tyva Kyzy performs a number of songs, often relating to the life of women, songs of their elders and of the land. They were recognized as the best players of national instruments in the Ustu-Hure Festival in Chadan, Tyva.

Non-musical activities
The group fosters growth, talent, and confidence in women and girls by teaching in Tuvan schools and leading workshops internationally. They aim to strengthen the livelihood of female khöömei and add an important new element and history to the development of Tuvan music. Female khöömei are still considered rare and sometimes controversial in Tuva. Tyva Kyzy is at the forefront of the effort to establish women among the great Tuvan throat singers.

Their first CD, "setkilemden sergek yr-dyr" (a cheerful song from my soul) was released in March 2006. Their second CD, "igi unu - iyem unu" (the igils voice - my mothers voice) was released in 2009. Both CDs are available from the Tuva Trader website (see below).

References

External links
Review from Asian Art Museum San Francisco Concert.
Article about throat-singing, featuring Tyva Kyzy, by Sarah Wallin.
Tyva Kyzy - Russian page.

Musical groups from Tuva